The following is a partial list of the main Modernista (Catalan art nouveau) buildings located in Barcelona.

List

See also
 Modernisme
 Antoni Gaudí
 Lluís Domènech i Montaner
 Josep Puig i Cadafalch

External links

 Ruta del modernisme (Barcelona Modernisme Route)

 
Buildings and structures in Barcelona
Lists of buildings and structures in Catalonia
Barcelona-related lists